The Labrador Sea (French: mer du Labrador, Danish: Labradorhavet) is an arm of the North Atlantic Ocean between the Labrador Peninsula and Greenland. The sea is flanked by continental shelves to the southwest, northwest, and northeast. It connects to the north with Baffin Bay through the Davis Strait. It is a marginal sea of the Atlantic.

The sea formed upon separation of the North American Plate and Greenland Plate that started about 60 million years ago and stopped about 40 million years ago. It contains one of the world's largest turbidity current channel systems, the Northwest Atlantic Mid-Ocean Channel (NAMOC), that runs for thousands of kilometers along the sea bottom toward the Atlantic Ocean.

The Labrador Sea is a major source of the North Atlantic Deep Water, a cold water mass that flows at great depth along the western edge of the North Atlantic, spreading out to form the largest identifiable water mass in the World Ocean.

History
The Labrador Sea formed upon separation of the North American Plate and Greenland Plate that started about 60 million years ago (Paleocene) and stopped about 40 million years ago. A sedimentary basin, which is now buried under the continental shelves, formed during the Cretaceous. Onset of magmatic sea-floor spreading was accompanied by volcanic eruptions of picrites and basalts in the Paleocene at the Davis Strait and Baffin Bay.

Between about 500 BC and 1300 AD, the southern coast of the sea contained Dorset, Beothuk and Inuit settlements; Dorset tribes were later replaced by Thule people.

Extent

The International Hydrographic Organization defines the limits of the Labrador Sea as follows:

On the North: the South limit of Davis Strait [The parallel of 60° North between Greenland and Labrador].

On the East: a line from Cape St. Francis  (Newfoundland) to Cape Farewell (Greenland).

On the West: the East Coast of Labrador and Newfoundland and the Northeast limit of the Gulf of St. Lawrence – a line running from Cape Bauld (North point of Kirpon Island) to the East extreme of Belle Isle and on to the Northeast Ledge. Thence a line joining this ledge with the East extreme of Cape St. Charles (52°13'N) in Labrador.
Natural Resources Canada uses a slightly different definition, putting the northern boundary of the Labrador Sea on a straight line from a headland on Killiniq Island abutting Lady Job Harbour to Cape Farewell.

Oceanography

It is called the Northwest Atlantic Mid-Ocean Channel (NAMOC) and is one of the world's longest drainage systems of Pleistocene age. It appears as a submarine river bed with numerous tributaries and is maintained by high-density turbidity currents flowing within the levees.

The salinity is relatively low, at 31–34.9 parts per thousand. Two-thirds of the sea is covered in ice in winter. Tides are semi-diurnal (i.e. occur twice a day), reaching .

There is an anticlockwise water circulation in the sea. It is initiated by the East Greenland Current and continued by the West Greenland Current, which brings warmer, more saline waters northwards, along the Greenland coasts up to the Baffin Bay. Then, the Baffin Island Current and Labrador Current transport cold and less saline water southward along the Canadian coast. These currents carry numerous icebergs and therefore hinder navigation and exploration of the gas fields beneath the sea bed.

The sea provides a significant part of the North Atlantic Deep Water (NADW) – a cold water mass that flows at great depth along the western edge of the North Atlantic, spreading out to form the largest identifiable water mass in the World Ocean. The NADW consists of three parts of different origin and salinity, and the top one, the Labrador Sea Water (LSW), is formed in the Labrador Sea. This part occurs at a medium depth and has a relatively low salinity (34.84–34.89 parts per thousand), low temperature and high oxygen content compared to the layers above and below it. LSW also has a relatively low vorticity, i.e. the tendency to form vortices, than any other water in North Atlantic that reflects its high homogeneity. It has a potential density of 27.76–27.78 mg/cm3 relatively to the surface layers, meaning it is denser, and thus sinks under the surface and remains homogeneous and unaffected by the surface fluctuations.

Fauna
The northern and western parts of the Labrador Sea are covered in ice between December and June. The drift ice serves as a breeding ground for seals in early spring. The sea is also a feeding ground for Atlantic salmon and several marine mammal species. Shrimp fisheries began in 1978 and intensified toward 2000, as well as cod fishing. However, the cod fishing rapidly depleted the fish population in the 1990s near the Labrador and West Greenland banks and was therefore halted in 1992. Other fishery targets include haddock, Atlantic herring, lobster and several species of flatfish and pelagic fish such as sand lance and capelin. They are most abundant in the southern parts of the sea.

Beluga whales, while abundant to the north, in the Baffin Bay, where their population reaches 20,000, are rare in the Labrador Sea, especially since the 1950s. The sea contains one of the two major stocks of Sei whales, the other one being the Scotian Shelf. Also common are minke and bottlenose whales.

The Labrador duck was a common bird on the Canadian coast until the 19th century, but is now extinct. Other coastal animals include the Labrador wolf (Canis lupus labradorius), caribou (Rangifer spp.), moose (Alces alces), black bear (Ursus americanus), red fox (Vulpes vulpes), Arctic fox (Alopex lagopus), wolverine, snowshoe hare (Lepus americanus), grouse (Dendragapus spp.), osprey (Pandion haliaetus), raven (Corvus corax), ducks, geese, partridge and American wild pheasant.

Flora
Coastal vegetation includes black spruce (Picea mariana), tamarack, white spruce (P. glauca), dwarf birch (Betula spp.), aspen, willow (Salix spp.), ericaceous shrubs (Ericaceae), cottongrass (Eriophorum spp.), sedge (Carex spp.), lichens and moss. Evergreen bushes of Labrador tea, which is used to make herbal teas, are common in the area, both on the Greenland and Canadian coasts.

References

 
Oceanography
Seas of Greenland
Seas of the Atlantic Ocean
Bodies of water of Newfoundland and Labrador
Seas of Canada
Geography of North America
Cenozoic rifts and grabens